Auguste-Charles-Joseph de Flahaut de La Billarderie, comte de Flahaut (21 April 17851 September 1870) was a French general during the Napoleonic Wars, a statesman, a Senator, and late in life, a French Ambassador to the Court of St James's.

Biography
 

He was born in Paris, officially the son of maréchal de camp Charles-François de Flahaut de La Billarderie, comte de Flahaut (2nd son of Charles-César, marquis de La Billarderie) who was guillotined at Arras in February 1793, by his wife, Adélaïde Filleul. The first wife of his father was Françoise-Louise Poisson, sister of the Marquise de Pompadour.

However, Charles de Flahaut was generally recognized to be the offspring of his mother's liaison with Talleyrand, with whom he was closely connected throughout his life. His mother took him with her into exile in 1792, and they remained abroad until 1798, moving from England to Switzerland (where she is rumoured to have "become involved" with Louis-Philippe, then Duke of Orleans), before Hamburg where she met her second husband, Ambassador Dom José Maria do Carmo de Sousa Botelho Mourão e Vasconcelos, 5.º Morgado de Mateus.

Charles de Flahaut volunteered for military service joining the cavalry in 1800, and received his army commission after the Battle of Marengo. He was appointed Aide-de-camp to Joachim Murat, 1st Prince Murat, and was present at the Battle of Austerlitz. He was wounded at the Battle of Landbach in 1805. At the same time, Flahaut was involved in a liaison with Napoleon's younger sister, Caroline Bonaparte.

At Warsaw he met Anne Poniatowska, Countess Potocka with whom he quickly became intimate. After the Battle of Friedland, he was awarded the Legion of Honour and returned to Paris in 1807. He served in Spain in 1808, and then in Germany, reaching the rank of Colonel in that campaign. After the Battle of Wagram, general Louis-Alexandre Berthier made him his Aide-de-camp, leaving the staff of Murat, and awarded him the empty tittle of Baron of the Empire.

Meanwhile, the Countess Potocka had established herself in Paris, but Flahaut had by this time entered into a relationship with Queen Hortense de Beauharnais, wife of King Louis Bonaparte; the birth of their son was registered in Paris on 21 October 1811 as Charles-Auguste-Louis-Joseph Demorny, later created Duc de Morny.

Flahaut fought with distinction in the Russian Campaign of 1812 and, in 1813, was appointed Brigadier-General and Aide-de-camp to Emperor Napoleon, being promoted, after the Battle of Leipzig, as a Général de division and Adjutant general. In 1813, he was selected to meet the King of Saxony and conduct him to his capital. After the Battle of Dresden, he was made Count by Napoleon, and fought at the Battle of Hanau against the Bavarians.

After Napoleon's abdication in 1814, he submitted to the new French government, but was placed on the retired list in September. He refused to betray Napoleon despite the efforts of the Bourbons to rally him in their service. Flahaut was assiduous in his attendance on Queen Hortense de Beauharnais until the Hundred Days brought him back into active service. With the return of Napoleon from the island of Elba, Flahaut joined his campaign to Paris and was placed in charge of reforming the army to the Emperor's standard.

A mission to Vienna to secure the return of Empress Marie-Louise of the House of Habsburg-Lorraine resulted in failure. He was present at the Battle of Waterloo (as an Aide-de-camp to Napoleon), and afterwards sought to place Napoleon II on the throne.
He was spared exile due to an intervention by Talleyrand, but was placed under police surveillance. Flahaut then chose to leave for Germany, and thence to Britain.

The Flahauts returned to France in 1827 and, in 1830, King Louis-Philippe of the House of Bourbon-Orléans promoted the Count to the rank of Lieutenant-General as well as creating him a Peer of France. He remained a staunch supporter of Talleyrand's policies, and in 1831 served briefly as French Ambassador to Berlin.
Subsequently, he was attached to the household of Ferdinand-Philippe of France, Duke of Orléans and, in 1841, was posted as Ambassador to Vienna, where he remained until 1848, when he was dismissed and retired from army service.

After the Coup d'état of 1851 by Napoleon III, his services were re-engaged, and from 1860 to 1862 he served in Britain as French Ambassador to the Court of St James's under Queen Victoria of the House of Hanover.

In 1852, he became a Senator of the Second French Empire, and in 1854, he became a member of the Commission appointed to edit the works of Napoleon I. In 1864, the Flahauts returned to Paris and took up residence at the Hôtel de Salm, when Charles was appointed Grand Chancellor of the Legion of Honour. He died in Paris on 1 September 1870.

In the opinion of the unnamed author of a biography on Flahaut in the Encyclopædia Britannica Eleventh Edition: "The comte de Flahaut is perhaps better remembered for his exploits in gallantry, and the elegant manners in which he had been carefully trained by his mother, than for his public services, which were not, however, so inconsiderable as they have sometimes been represented to be".

Family
Flahaut was the lover of Napoleon I's stepdaughter, Hortense de Beauharnais (Queen of Holland), with whom he had an illegitimate son, Charles Demorny (1811–1865) who later became Duke of Morny.  The Duke later married Sophia Sergeyevna Trubetskaya, a Russian Princess of the House of Trubetskoy.

While in Britain Flahaut married in Edinburgh on 20 June 1817 The Hon. Margaret Mercer Elphinstone (1788–1867), daughter of Admiral George, Viscount Keith GCB; she succeeded, in her own right, as 2nd Baroness Keith in 1823 and de jure 7th Lady Nairne in 1837. Her father, George Keith, was the admiral who was in charge of preventing the escape of Napoleon from France after the Battle of Waterloo, and who received and supervised the final surrender of Napoleon to Saint Helena in 1815.

They had five daughters:
Emily Jane de Flahaut (16 May 181925 June 1895), married on 1 November 1843 to Henry, 4th Marquess of Lansdowne KG.
Clémentine de Flahaut (29 April 18215 January 1836), died young.
Georgiana Gabrielle de Flahaut (182216 July 1907), married on 2 February 1871 to Jean Charles Marie Félix, Marquis of La Valette. 
Adélaïde Joséphine Elisabeth de Flahaut (18243 April 1841), died young.
Sarah Sophie Louise de Flahaut (182510 June 1853), died unmarried.

Honours 
  Count of the Empire
  Grand-Cross of the Légion d'honneur
  Grand Cordon of the Order of Leopold
  Commander of the Military Order of St. Henry, 1st Class, 1813
  Grand Cross of the Saxe-Ernestine House Order, March 1843

Notes

Further reading
 Bernardy, Françoise de (Lucy Norton transl.), Son of Talleyrand: The life of Comte Charles de Flahaut, 1785–1870, London (1956) 
 Chaumont, Jean-Philippe (editor), Archives du général Charles de Flahaut et de sa famille : 565 AP : inventaire, Centre historique des archives nationales, Paris (2005)   
 .
. This work cites Mosley
 
 Scarisbrick, Diana, Margaret de Flahaut (1788–1867): A Scotswoman at the French Court, Cambridge (2019)  

Attribution:

External links 
Biographie chez www.charles-de-flahaut.fr 

1785 births
1870 deaths
Politicians from Paris
Counts of the First French Empire
French generals
French Senators of the Second Empire
Grand Croix of the Légion d'honneur
Grand Chanceliers of the Légion d'honneur
Ambassadors of France to the Austrian Empire
Ambassadors of France to Prussia
Ambassadors of France to the United Kingdom
Members of the Chamber of Peers of the Hundred Days
Members of the Chamber of Peers of the July Monarchy
French commanders of the Napoleonic Wars
Names inscribed under the Arc de Triomphe